Hopestreet Recordings is an independent  record label based in Melbourne, Australia founded in 2009.

Discography

Artists 
 The Putbacks
 The Bombay Royale
 The Cactus Channel
 Emma Donovan
 Quarter Street
 Zillanova
 San Lazaro
 The Meltdown
 The Public Opinion Afro Orchestra
 Erin Buku
 Zretro
 Immy Owusu
 Karate Boogaloo
 Love Songs & D
 Izy
 Leisure Centre

References

External links
 Official website

Australian independent record labels
Record labels based in Melbourne